Rodrigo Costa may refer to:
Rodrigo Costa (footballer, born 1975), Brazilian football centre-back
Rodrigo Costa (footballer, born 1976), Brazilian football forward
Villa (footballer) (born 1983), full name Rodrigo Augusto Sartori Costa, Brazilian football midfielder

See also 
 Rodrigo da Costa (disambiguation)